Peas 'n' Rice is the fourth album by American jazz vibraphonist Freddie McCoy which was recorded in 1967 (with one track from a session in 1965) for the Prestige label.

Reception

Allmusic rated the album 2 stars.

Track listing
All compositions by Freddie McCoy except where noted.
 "Peas 'n' Rice" – 4:00   
 "Summer in the City" (John Sebastian, Mark Sebastian, Steve Boone) – 2:45   
 "Huh!" – 4:05   
 "1-2-3" (John Medora, David White, Len Barry) – 4:15   
 "One Cylinder" – 3:07   
 "Call Me" (Tony Hatch) – 3:30   
 "Lightning Strikes" – 2:30   
 "My Funny Valentine" (Richard Rodgers, Lorenz Hart) – 6:00   
 "You Stepped Out of a Dream" (Nacio Herb Brown, Gus Kahn) – 4:00  
Recorded at Van Gelder Studio in Englewood Cliffs, New Jersey on October 6, 1965 (track 9), April 10, 1967 (tracks 2, 3 & 5-7)  and  May 4, 1967 (tracks 1, 4 & 8)

Personnel 
Freddie McCoy – vibraphone 
Wilbur "Dud" Buscomb, Edward David Williams – trumpet (tracks 2, 3 & 5-7)
JoAnne Brackeen (tracks 1-8), Charles L. Wilson (track 9) – piano
Wally Richardson – guitar (tracks 2, 3 & 5-7)
Steve Davis – bass (track 9)
Eustis Guillemet – electric bass, bass (tracks 1-8)
Rudy Lawless (track 9), Ray Lucas (tracks 2, 3 & 5-7), Kalil Madi (tracks 1, 4 & 8) – drums
Dave Blume – arranger, conductor (tracks 2, 3 & 5-7)

References 

1967 albums
Freddie McCoy albums
Prestige Records albums
Albums recorded at Van Gelder Studio
Albums produced by Cal Lampley